Rock Branch may refer to:

Rock Branch, Georgia, an unincorporated community
Rock Branch, Iowa, an unincorporated community
Rock Branch (Camp Creek), a stream in Missouri
Rock Branch (Huzzah Creek), a stream in Missouri
Rock Branch (Haw River tributary), a stream in Guilford County, North Carolina
Rock Branch (Fivemile Creek), a stream in Oklahoma and Missouri

See also
Rocky Branch (disambiguation)